The 2013–14 Albany Great Danes men's basketball team represented the University at Albany, SUNY during the 2013–14 NCAA Division I men's basketball season. The Great Danes, led by 13th year head coach Will Brown, played their home games at SEFCU Arena and were members of the America East Conference. They finished the season 19–15, 9–7 in American East play to finish in fourth place. They were champions of the America East Conference tournament to earn an automatic bid to the NCAA tournament. In the NCAA Tournament, they defeated Mount St. Mary's in the First Four before losing in the second round to Florida.

Roster

Schedule

|-
!colspan=12 style=| Regular season

|-
!colspan=12 style=| America East tournament

|-
!colspan=12 style=| NCAA tournament

References

Albany Great Danes men's basketball seasons
Albany
Albany
Albany Great Danes men's basketball
Albany Great Danes men's basketball